Mirabel most often refers to Montréal–Mirabel International Airport in Quebec, Canada.

Mirabel, Mirabelle or Mirabell may also refer to:
Mirabel (name), a female given name

Places

Austria
Mirabell Palace, in Salzburg

Canada
Mirabel, Quebec, a city northwest of Montreal
Mirabel (provincial electoral district), a provincial constituency in Quebec
Mirabel (territory equivalent to a regional county municipality), a statistical area in Quebec, also a census division

France
Mirabel, Ardèche, a commune in the Ardèche department
Mirabel, Tarn-et-Garonne, a commune in the Tarn-et-Garonne department
Mirabel-aux-Baronnies, a commune in the Drôme department
Mirabel-et-Blacons, a commune in the Drôme department
Saint-Jean-Mirabel, a commune in the Lot department

Israel
Mirabel (castle), a Crusader castle now part of Migdal Afek  national park

Spain
Mirabel, Spain, a municipality in the province of Cáceres and autonomous community of Extremadura

United States
Mirabel, California, a former settlement

Other uses
HydroSerre Mirabel, a Canadian hydroponic produce company
  (Mutualisation d'Informations sur les Revues et leurs Accès dans les Bases En Ligne), index est. 2009
Mirabell: Books of Number, a volume of poetry by James Merrill, published in 1978

See also
Maribel (disambiguation)
Mirabelle (disambiguation)
Mirabella (disambiguation)
Mirabello (disambiguation)